Rittmannshagener See is a lake in the Mecklenburgische Seenplatte district in Mecklenburgische Seenplatte, Mecklenburg-Vorpommern, Germany. At an elevation of 31.9 m, its surface area is 0.482 km².

Lakes of Mecklenburg-Western Pomerania
LRittermannshagenerSee